The official German Airplay Chart is an airplay chart compiled by Nielsen Music Control on behalf of Bundesverband Musikindustrie (Federal Association of Phonographic Industry).

Chart history

External links
 radiocharts.com

References

Germany airplay
Airplay 2023